Piła Kościelecka  is a village in the administrative district of Gmina Trzebinia, within Chrzanów County, Lesser Poland Voivodeship, in southern Poland.

The village has a population of 572.

References

Villages in Chrzanów County